Hang Ten is a Hong Kong-owned lifestyle and apparel company that had its origins in surf wear but now makes mass-market casual clothing and other items, selling the bulk of its products in the East Asian market, including Hong Kong, Taiwan and South Korea. Hang Ten's name comes from the surfing maneuver of 'hanging ten', that is, to hang all ten toes over the edge of the surfboard. Its original logo was a sewed-on pair of little feet. Today, the company licenses its logo and designs for apparel, paddle-boards, skateboards, surfboards, sun care, and other lifestyle products. Hang Ten products are sold in many countries around the world, including the United States, Canada, Mexico, Panama, Brazil, Hong Kong, Korea, Taiwan, Japan, China, Singapore, Myanmar, the Philippines, Malaysia, Cambodia, Pakistan and South Africa.

History
Hang Ten was founded in 1960 in Seal Beach, California by Doris Moore and Duke Boyd, as a maker of surfing apparel. It branched into other sports apparel, and helped develop the action-sports apparel industry. Boyd sold Hang Ten in 1970. The brand was bought by Hong Kong-based conglomerate Li & Fung in 2012.

See also
 Golden Breed, a surf wear company subsequently founded by Duke Boyd

References

External links
 Hang Ten USA official website

Surfwear brands
Companies formerly listed on the Hong Kong Stock Exchange
Hong Kong brands